William Lawrence Johnson (October 18, 1892 – November 5, 1950) was an American professional baseball player who had two seasons as an MLB outfielder with the Philadelphia Athletics. He started with the Athletics on September 22, 1916, and his last game was July 4, 1917. Johnson was a right fielder.

He was born in Chicago, Illinois, and died in Los Angeles, where he is buried in the Los Angeles National Cemetery.

Notes

External links 

1892 births
1950 deaths
Major League Baseball right fielders
Philadelphia Athletics players
Burials at Los Angeles National Cemetery
Baseball players from Chicago